This is list of ministers of the Ministry of Justice of Thailand.

Ministers of Justice of Siam (1891-1932)

Ministers of Justice of Thailand (1932-present) 
The functions of the Ministry of Justice lapsed during the following periods:

 A coup by Field Marshall Phin Choonhavan during November 8-24, 1947.
 A coup led by Field Marshall Sarit Thanarat during September 16-21, 1957.
 A coup led by Field Marshall Sarit Thanarat during October 20, 1958-February 9, 1959.
 A Self-coup led by Field Marshall Thanom Kittikachorn during November 17, 1971-December 17, 1972.
 The coup led by Admiral Sangad Chaloryu during October 6-8, 1976. and October 20, 1977-November 11, 1977.
 National Peace Keeping Council oversaw operations during February 24, 1991-March 1, 1991.
 The Council for National Security oversaw operations during September 19, 2006-October 1, 2006.
 The National Council for Peace and Order oversaw operations during May 22, 2014-August 30, 2014.

See also
Ministry of Justice
รัฐมนตรีว่าการกระทรวงยุติธรรมของไทย (Thai Minister of Justice)

References

Lists of political office-holders in Thailand